Zaton is a rural locality (a selo) in Karaulinsky Selsoviet, Kamyzyaksky District, Astrakhan Oblast, Russia. The population was 791 as of 2010. There are 6 streets.

Geography 
Zaton is located 28 km south of Kamyzyak (the district's administrative centre) by road. Lebyazhye is the nearest rural locality.

References 

Rural localities in Kamyzyaksky District